Mario Bruschera (16 April 1887 – 23 February 1968) was an Italian professional road racing cyclist. He competed at the 1912 Giro d'Italia.

References

1887 births
1968 deaths
Cyclists from Milan
Italian male cyclists